Coleophora varisequens is a moth of the family Coleophoridae. It is found in Inner Mongolia, China.

The wingspan is 9–12 mm.

References

varisequens
Moths of Asia
Moths described in 2005